Euchee is an unincorporated community in Meigs County, in the U.S. state of Tennessee.

History
A post office called Euchee was established in 1870, and remained in operation until 1935. The community was named after the Yuchi (or Euchee) Indians.

References

Unincorporated communities in Meigs County, Tennessee